"Audio" is a song by pop music group LSD. The song was released on 10 May 2018, and marks the group's second release, following "Genius".

Music video
The song's music video was directed by Ernest Desumbila. It opens with Diplo purchasing a used BMW 8 Series and finding a fresh LSD tape in the glovebox. As he hits play on "Audio", the clip jumps to a young girl walking home from school, who encounters an animated Sia balloon floating through the air. The girl takes the balloon with her to a sprawling parking lot, where a dance routine breaks out once the "Audio" chorus drops. More psychedelic animations fill the scenery as Diplo speeds through the parched Los Angeles riverbed and Labrinth wanders the otherwise empty city.

This song was featured in Fortnite’s Ariana Grande Concert in 2021

Track listing
Digital download
"Audio" (CID Remix) – 2:41

Personnel
Credits adapted from Tidal.
 Diplo – production, programming
 Labrinth – production, engineering, programming
 King Henry – production, programming
 Jr Blender – programming, co-production
 Gustave Rudman – production
 Manny Marroquin – mix engineering
 Chris Galland – mix engineering
 Randy Merrill – master engineering
 Bart Schoudel – engineering
 Robin Florent – engineering assistance
 Scott Desmarais – engineering assistance

Charts

Weekly charts

Year-end charts

Certifications

Release history

See also
 Diplo discography
 Labrinth discography
 Sia discography

References

2018 singles
2018 songs
Columbia Records singles
Electronic songs
LSD (group) songs
Psychedelic songs
Song recordings produced by Diplo
Songs written by Diplo
Songs written by Jr Blender
Songs written by King Henry (producer)
Songs written by Labrinth
Songs written by Sia (musician)